Shane Walsh may refer to:
Shane Walsh (Australian footballer) (born 1959), Australian rules footballer for Footscray
Shane Walsh (Gaelic footballer) (born 1993), for Galway
Shane Walsh (Waterford hurler) (born 1983), Irish hurler for Waterford
Shane Walsh (Kilkenny hurler) (born 1996), Irish hurler for Kilkenny
Shane Walsh (swimmer) (born 1976), Paralympic swimming competitor from Australia
Shane Walsh (The Walking Dead), fictional character in The Walking Dead

See also
Walsh (surname)